Hewins is a surname, and may refer to:

 Amasa Hewins (1795–1855), American portrait, genre and landscape painter
 Caroline Hewins (1846–1926), American librarian
 Mark Hewins (born 1955), British jazz guitarist
 Mary Hewins
 Ralph Hewins (1909–1985), British biographer
 Rob Hewins (born 1958), British drummer for Showaddywaddy and formerly Martin Turner's Wishbone Ash
 William Hewins (1865–1931), British economist and Conservative politician